Of the 3,300 species of flowering plants in the Nilgiri Biosphere Reserve in southern India, 132 are endemic. The reserve encompasses portions of the Western Ghats and Nilgiri Hills in the states of Karnataka, Kerala, and Tamil Nadu. They are listed by plant family. Plants with an asterisk* are listed in The IUCN Red List of Threatened Species. Plants with a dagger (†) are presumed extinct.

References

Endemic flora of India (region)
Flora of Karnataka
Flora of Kerala
Flora of Tamil Nadu
Endemic
Nilgiri, Endemic
South Western Ghats moist deciduous forests
South Western Ghats montane rain forests